General Sir Robert Biddulph,  (26 August 1835 – 18 November 1918) was a senior British Army officer. He served as Quartermaster-General to the Forces in 1893, and was then Governor of Gibraltar until 1900.

Military career
Educated at Twyford School and the Royal Military Academy, Woolwich, Biddulph was commissioned into the Royal Artillery in 1853. He served in the Crimean War and was present at the Siege of Sevastopol in 1854. He then served in the Indian Mutiny, and was Brigade Major during the Siege of Lucknow in 1857.

In 1871 he was selected to be Assistant Adjutant-General at the War Office and then in 1879 he succeeded Sir Garnet Wolseley as High Commissioner and Commander-in-Chief of Cyprus. In 1886, he returned to London to be Inspector-General of Recruiting and two years later became Director-General of Military Education. In 1893 he was briefly Quartermaster-General to the Forces. Later that year he became Governor of Gibraltar, serving as such until 1900. He was Colonel Commandant of Royal Artillery, and was placed on retired pay on 26 August 1902.

His final appointment, in 1904, was as Army Purchase Commissioner: in that capacity he abolished the purchase of commissions.

He was appointed Knight Grand Cross of the Order of the Bath in the 1899 Birthday Honours. Biddulph's Gate in Famagusta in Cyprus is named after him.

Family
Biddulph was the son of Robert Biddulph, MP. In 1864 he married Sophia Lambert and together they went on to have four sons and six daughters.

References

 

1835 births
1918 deaths
Burials in England
British Army generals
British Army personnel of the Crimean War
British Army personnel of the Second Opium War
British military personnel of the Indian Rebellion of 1857
Governors of Gibraltar
Knights Grand Cross of the Order of St Michael and St George
Knights Grand Cross of the Order of the Bath
People educated at Twyford School
Royal Artillery officers
Military personnel from London